is a Japanese voice actress represented by Arts Vision. Some of her major roles include: Kumiko Yamaguchi in Gokusen, Saori Eguchi in Mirmo, Maya Takahashi in Amagami, Cao Rin Shen in Fighting Beauty Wulong, Maria Momoe in Big Windup!, Ryoku in Lilpri, and Yu and Aoi Kuchiba in The Qwaser of Stigmata.

Filmography

Anime

Film

Video games

References

External links
  at Arts Vision 
 

Japanese voice actresses
1975 births
Living people
Voice actresses from Osaka Prefecture
21st-century Japanese actresses
Arts Vision voice actors